The 2010 Exeter City Council election took place on 9 September 2010 to elect members of Exeter City Council in England. One third of seats were up for election. The elections took place later in the year than other local elections. Exeter had previously been granted permission to become a unitary authority, with local elections postponed until 2011. When the Coalition Government won the general election earlier that year, Exeter's permission to form a unitary authority was overturned. Because of this, the High Court ruled that those councillors who had stayed on beyond their four-year term were no longer constitutionally elected, and would need to seek re-election. This resulted in there being an election in every ward in September to renew the mandate for the wards.

However, no election was needed in Pennsylvania ward, as a by-election had been held on 6 May, the day on which the local elections would ordinarily have taken place, to fill a vacancy for the seat that would have been due for re-election in 2010 in any case. Therefore, the winner of the May by-election was deemed to be elected to represent the ward for a full four-year term. The result of the May by-election is included in the results given.

Background
The previous election in 2008 had left the council under no overall control with the Liberal Democrats as the largest party on 13 seats, followed by the Conservatives on 12, Labour on 11 and the Liberal Party on four. However, the week before the election, two Liberal Democrat councillors defected to Labour in protest against the party's coalition with the Conservatives. This meant that Labour were the largest party going into the election, on 13 seats to the Conservatives' 12 and the Liberal Democrats' 11.

Results summary

Ward results

Alphington

Cowick

Duryard

Exwick

Heavitree

Mincinglake

Newtown

Pennsylvania

Pinhoe

Polsloe

Priory

St Davids

Topsham

Whipton & Barton

References

2010 English local elections
2010
2010s in Exeter